Prendergast Ladywell School is a co-educational all-through school located in the Crofton Park area of the London Borough of Lewisham, England.

Originally known as Crofton School, it was completely rebuilt between 2007 and 2008. In 2009 the school entered into the Worshipful Company of Leathersellers federation of schools, and was renamed Prendergast Ladywell Fields College. Other schools in the federation include Prendergast School and Prendergast Vale School. Previously a secondary school, in 2014 a primary school provision was opened on a separate site. The combined all-through school was renamed Prendergast Ladywell School.

Prendergast Ladywell School also offers GCSEs and BTECs as programmes of study for pupils. The school also has a specialism in the Arts.

References

External links
 Prendergast Ladywell School official website

Secondary schools in the London Borough of Lewisham
Foundation schools in the London Borough of Lewisham
Primary schools in the London Borough of Lewisham